Christopher John Osgood (born November 26, 1972) is a Canadian former professional ice hockey goaltender who is currently a Detroit Red Wings studio analyst and part-time color commentator for Bally Sports Detroit. He won three Stanley Cup championships in his career, all with the Red Wings, with two of them coming while he was starting goaltender. He is ranked twelfth in wins in NHL regular season history with 401.

Osgood spent the first part of his 17-year NHL career with the Red Wings, then the New York Islanders and the St. Louis Blues before returning to Detroit in 2005. Osgood was known in Detroit by his nicknames "Ozzie," chanted by the crowd after a big save, and "The Wizard of Oz."

He was the last NHL goalie to wear a traditional player's helmet/cage combo instead of the newer one piece goalie mask until Rick DiPietro briefly wore one of Osgood's in 2011, after he was injured in a fight with Brent Johnson. He is also one of only 13 goaltenders in NHL history to have scored a goal, and one of only nine to have scored by shooting the puck directly into the opponent's net (not an "own goal"), on March 6, 1996 versus the Hartford Whalers.

Playing career
Chris Osgood was drafted 54th overall by the Red Wings, in the third round of the 1991 NHL Entry Draft and made his debut during the 1993–94 season.

Rookie year
Osgood became the fourth goaltender to man the crease for Detroit that season alongside Tim Cheveldae, Vincent Riendeau, and Peter Ing. Cheveldae, the team's primary starter and a former All-Star, along with Dallas Drake, was traded to the Winnipeg Jets in exchange for veteran goaltender Bob Essensa and defenceman Sergei Bautin. Essensa did not have a strong showing in a 13-game stint at the end of the regular season, and Osgood was named the primary goaltender for the playoffs. The heavily favored Red Wings were defeated in seven games by the San Jose Sharks. The most memorable scene of the series occurred in the deciding game. With the game tied 2–2 late in the third period, Osgood went to clear a puck around the boards, but it landed on Sharks forward Jamie Baker's stick, who then scored the winning goal. Overtaken by remorse at his mistake, the young goaltender wept at his stall following the game.

Following the season, Detroit management felt that the team needed a strong veteran goaltender with Stanley Cup playoff experience. In the summer of 1994, the Red Wings traded defenceman Steve Chiasson to the Calgary Flames for goaltender Mike Vernon, who had previously helped the Flames to the Stanley Cup title in 1989.

Initial Detroit success
While the 1994–95 season started late due to a lockout, Osgood served as a backup goaltender for Mike Vernon for the season. The Wings reached the 1995 Stanley Cup Finals that season, where they were swept in four games by the underdog New Jersey Devils. Osgood received significantly more playing time for the 1995–96 season, and he led the NHL with a 2.17 GAA and 39 wins. He also finished third in shutouts (5) and was a Vezina Trophy runner-up to Jim Carey. Osgood and Vernon shared the William M. Jennings Trophy as the goaltenders allowing the fewest goals in the league. For his efforts Osgood was selected to the NHL All-Star Game and was also named to the post-season NHL All-Star second team.

That season, he scored against the Hartford Whalers, becoming the second goaltender in NHL history to score a goal, after Ron Hextall. Former Islanders goaltender Billy Smith was also credited with a goal as the player last touching the puck, but only Osgood and Hextall directly shot the puck in.

The next season, Osgood and Vernon shared starting goaltender duties in the regular season, but when the playoffs started, virtually all the playing time went to Vernon, who ended up winning the Conn Smythe Trophy. In the end, Osgood had his name engraved on the Stanley Cup as the Red Wings swept the Philadelphia Flyers in four games to win their first Stanley Cup in 42 years.

After the Cup win in 1997, Vernon was traded to the San Jose Sharks, which made Osgood Detroit's number-one goaltender. Again, the Red Wings were able to advance to the Stanley Cup finals and defeated the Washington Capitals in another four-game sweep to win back-to-back Stanley Cup championships.

On April 1, 1998, he was in a goalie fight with Colorado Avalanche goalie Patrick Roy. Roy had a fight with Vernon the previous year on March 26, 1997.

Osgood remained the primary goaltender for Detroit until the summer of 2001, working alongside Ken Wregget, and Manny Legacé before being put on waivers and picked up by the New York Islanders.

Islander years
In the summer of 2001, the Red Wings acquired goaltender Dominik Hašek, a six-time Vezina Trophy winner, from the Buffalo Sabres. After numerous attempts to trade Osgood, the Red Wings left him unprotected in the waiver draft, and he was acquired by the Islanders on September 28, 2001. Initially, Osgood wore the red pads that he'd worn the previous year with the Red Wings before eventually changing his equipment to the blue of the Islanders.

Osgood split playing time with Garth Snow for the 2001–2002 season and helped the Islanders to a playoff berth where they lost a seven-game series to the Toronto Maple Leafs. Osgood split time with both Snow and Rick DiPietro for the 2002–2003 season before being traded to the St. Louis Blues on March 11, 2003, along with a third round pick in the 2003 NHL draft (which would be Konstantin Barulin) for Justin Papineau and a second round pick in the 2003 draft (Jeremy Colliton).

Stint in St. Louis
For the remainder of the 2002–2003 season and the entire 2003–2004 season, Osgood remained the primary goaltender for the St. Louis Blues. Although Osgood posted winning records for both seasons, the Blues did not advance past the playoff quarterfinals, losing to the Vancouver Canucks and San Jose Sharks, respectively. Osgood's contract was not renewed by St. Louis before the expiration of the Collective bargaining Agreement, and he became a free agent.

Return to Detroit
On August 8, 2005, Detroit brought Osgood back with a one-year, $800,000 contract. He was initially set to compete for the starting job with Manny Legace, but suffered a groin tear and did not play when the season started. Osgood was assigned to play for the Grand Rapids Griffins of the American Hockey League (AHL) on a conditioning assignment. After posting a 2–1 record in three games, Osgood returned to Detroit to work in a goaltending tandem with Legace again.

Osgood also worked with rookie goaltenders Jimmy Howard and Joey MacDonald while Legacé recovered from knee injuries in late 2005. During the 2006 Stanley Cup playoffs, Osgood injured his groin preparing for Game 4 of the first round against the Edmonton Oilers. Osgood missed the remainder of the series, and the Red Wings post-season was over after 6 games against the Oilers.

On July 1, 2006, Osgood re-signed with the Red Wings to a two-year, $1.8 million USD contract. He then shared goaltending duties with Hašek, who also returned for another stint with the Red Wings. Though Hašek was expected to get slightly more playing time than Osgood throughout the regular season, it was expected that the goaltending tandem would have shared most of the playing time, with MacDonald expected to be their backup. However, Osgood suffered a fractured hand in practice, placing him on the injured reserve while MacDonald stepped up as the number 2 goaltender in Osgood's leave.

Osgood returned to playing by the end of December. Due to Osgood's injuries and the aging Hašek's ability to remain healthy throughout the season, Osgood ended up assuming the backup role for Hašek as opposed to sharing playing time.

The 2007–08 season served as a return to form for Osgood. Osgood and Hašek remained Detroit's goaltending tandem for the 2007–08 season. While Osgood was expected to be the backup goaltender, Hašek struggled at the beginning of the season and subsequently became injured. Osgood assumed the starting role while Hašek was injured and put up superior numbers. As of April 30, 2008, Osgood ranked 1st in the NHL in GAA with 2.09 during the regular season, ranked 16th in Save Percentage with 0.914 and has an impressive 27–9–4 record. That performance earned him both a 3 year/$4.5M contract extension with the Red Wings and an appearance at the 2008 NHL All-Star Game. With Hašek healthy and getting back into his stride, Detroit chose to alternate goaltenders instead of designating either goaltender as the backup.

2008 Stanley Cup playoffs

After Hašek performed poorly in Games 3 and 4 of their 2008 first round series with the Nashville Predators, Red Wings coach Mike Babcock decided to pull him in favor of Osgood midway through Game 4 and named him the starter for game 5 and the rest of the playoffs. With Osgood in goal, the Red Wings won their next nine playoff games in a row, defeating the Predators and sweeping the Colorado Avalanche as well as dealing the Dallas Stars a three-game deficit. Though the Stars battled back, winning their next two games, Osgood shone in game 6, stopping all but one shot in a game riddled with Red Wings penalties, sending them to the Stanley Cup Finals to meet the Pittsburgh Penguins. In games one and two of the Stanley Cup finals, Osgood had back-to-back shutouts, making him the fourth goalie in NHL history to start the Finals with back-to-back shutouts. Between the two games, he made a total of 41 saves. His save as time expired in Game Six sealed the Stanley Cup win for the Red Wings and for Osgood, who won his second championship as a starting goaltender. His final 2008 playoff record was 14–4 with a 1.55 GAA; he was considered a contender for the Conn Smythe Trophy which eventually went to Henrik Zetterberg.

Aftermath of the Stanley Cup
The following 2008–09 season was a sharp contrast to the 2008 playoffs for Osgood, who struggled heavily for virtually the entire season, and ended it with the worst statistical numbers of his entire career. "It was the worst I've played in that long of a stretch in my career," he said. "Let's be honest.". A combination of injuries and self-inflicted mental pressure adversely affected his game, to the point where late in the season he was essentially "sent home" for ten days by the Red Wings, in order for him to work with goaltending coach Jim Bedard and re-focus. Although his 26 wins put him 10th all-time in the NHL by season's end, he finished with a GAA a full goal above what he had posted in 2007–08, and a save percentage in the bottom ten percent of all 45 goalies who played enough to qualify.

Despite being visibly outplayed in nearly every aspect by Ty Conklin, whom he credited for not allowing the goaltending situation to become much worse than it was,  Osgood's immense playoff experience was referred to throughout the season, and as the unquestioned starting goaltender in the 2009 playoffs he played nearly every minute of 23 games, finishing with a 15–8 record. His drastically improved performance led to speculation that he was Detroit's leading candidate for the Conn Smythe Trophy as the Red Wings advanced to the Stanley Cup Finals for the second straight year. However in the end, Detroit was defeated in a rematch of the previous year with the Pittsburgh Penguins in seven games.

The following season, Osgood continued to struggle in regular season play, and eventually lost his position as Detroit's starting goaltender to rookie Jimmy Howard. However, the Red Wings in general under performed, especially during the beginning of the season. Osgood finished the 2009–10 season having played only 23 games, with most of these at the beginning of the season when he was still the starter, and posting a 3.02 GAA and .888 save percentage.

On December 27, 2010, in a game against the Colorado Avalanche at Pepsi Center, Osgood earned his 400th career victory. He became just the 10th goaltender in NHL history to reach this milestone. The Red Wings won the game 4–3 in overtime on a goal by Niklas Kronwall. Osgood had better statistics during the 2010-11 NHL season. On July 19, 2011, Osgood announced his retirement from ice hockey, but remained with the Wings organization in a role developing young goaltenders with the assistance of his former goaltending coach Tom Danko.

Post-playing career
On September 9, 2013, it was announced that Chris Osgood was hired as a Red Wings game and studio analyst for Fox Sports Detroit. Osgood replaced former teammate Larry Murphy, who was released by Fox Sports Detroit late through the 2012-13 season. Osgood primarily provides analysis in the studio, but also replaced Mickey Redmond on select road games throughout the season.

On August 30, 2016, Osgood, joined Red Wings' vice president Jim Devellano as part-owner of the Ontario Hockey League's Saginaw Spirit. Osgood serves as a goaltending and general consultant to the team.

Career statistics

Regular season and playoffs

Awards and achievements
 WHL East second All-Star team – 1991
 Member of the Stanley Cup Champion Detroit Red Wings – 1997, 1998, 2008 (starting goaltender in 1998 and 2008)
 2-time winner of the William M. Jennings Trophy (shared with Mike Vernon – 1996), (shared with Dominik Hašek – 2008)
 Is currently 13th all-time in wins by an NHL goaltender
 Is currently 8th in all-time playoff wins
 Is currently tied with Marc-André Fleury for 4th in all-time playoff shut-outs
 Played in
 1996 NHL All-Star Game
 2008 NHL All-Star Game (named starter by Red Wings and Western Conference head coach Mike Babcock)
 Named to the 1997 NHL All-Star Game, but was unable to attend because of an injury.
 Named to NHL second All-Star team after 1995–96 season
 Named to WHL East second All-Star team after 1990–91 season
 Led NHL in GAA in 2008 (regular season 2.09 & playoffs 1.55)
 Led NHL in wins in 1996
 Scored a goal versus Hartford Whalers on March 6, 1996.
 First goaltender since Terry Sawchuk to win Stanley Cups ten years or more apart as a starter (Sawchuk in 1955 and 1967)
 Became only the 10th goaltender in NHL history to achieve 400 wins on Dec 27th 2010 in a 4–3 overtime win against the Colorado Avalanche
 4th all-time NHL leader in win percentage (60%)

See also
 List of goaltenders who have scored a goal in an NHL game
 List of NHL goaltenders with 300 wins
 List of Detroit Red Wings draft picks
 List of Detroit Red Wings records

References

External links
 

1972 births
Living people
Adirondack Red Wings players
Brandon Wheat Kings players
Canadian ice hockey goaltenders
Detroit Red Wings coaches
Detroit Red Wings draft picks
Detroit Red Wings players
Grand Rapids Griffins players
Ice hockey people from Alberta
Medicine Hat Tigers players
National Hockey League All-Stars
National Hockey League goaltenders who have scored in a game
New York Islanders players
People from Northern Sunrise County
St. Louis Blues players
Seattle Thunderbirds players
Stanley Cup champions
William M. Jennings Trophy winners
Canadian ice hockey coaches